Oganesson (118Og) is a synthetic element created in particle accelerators, and thus a standard atomic weight cannot be given. Like all synthetic elements, it has no stable isotopes. The first and only isotope to be synthesized was 294Og in 2002 and 2005; it has a half-life of 700 microseconds.

List of isotopes 

|-
| rowspan=2| 294Og
| rowspan=2 style="text-align:right" | 118
| rowspan=2 style="text-align:right" | 176
| rowspan=2| 294.21392(71)#
| rowspan=2| 700 μs
| α
| 290Lv
| rowspan=2| 0+
|-
| SF
| (various)

Nucleosynthesis

Target-projectile combinations leading to Z=118 compound nuclei
The below table contains various combinations of targets and projectiles that could be used to form compound nuclei with Z=118.

Cold fusion

208Pb(86Kr,xn)294-xOg
In 1999, a team led by Victor Ninov at the Lawrence Berkeley National Laboratory performed this experiment, as a 1998 calculation by Robert Smolańczuk suggested a promising outcome. After eleven days of irradiation, three events of 293Og and its alpha decay products were reported in this reaction; this was the first reported discovery of element 118 and then-unknown element 116.

The following year, they published a retraction after researchers at other laboratories were unable to duplicate the results and the Berkeley lab could not duplicate them either. In June 2002, the director of the lab announced that the original claim of the discovery of these two elements had been based on data fabricated by principal author Victor Ninov. Newer experimental results and theoretical predictions have confirmed the exponential decrease in cross-sections with lead and bismuth targets as the atomic number of the resulting nuclide increases.

Hot fusion

249Cf(48Ca,xn)297-xOg (x=3)
Following successful experiments utilizing calcium-48 projectiles and actinide targets to generate elements 114 and 116, the search for element 118 was first performed at the Joint Institute for Nuclear Research (JINR) in 2002. One or two atoms of 294Og were produced in the 2002 experiment, and two more atoms were produced in a 2005 confirmation run. The discovery of element 118 was announced in 2006.

Because of the very small fusion reaction probability (the fusion cross section is ), the experiment took four months and involved a beam dose of  calcium ions that had to be shot at the californium target to produce the first recorded event believed to be the synthesis of oganesson.
Nevertheless, researchers were highly confident that the results were not a false positive; the chance that they were random events was estimated to be less than one part in 100,000.

In a 2012 experiment aimed at the confirmation of tennessine, one alpha decay chain was attributed to 294Og. This synthesis event resulted from the population of 249Cf in the target as the decay product of the 249Bk target (half-life 330 days); the cross section and decays were consistent with previously reported observations of 294Og.

From 1 October 2015 until 6 April 2016, the team at the JINR conducted a search for new isotopes of oganesson using a 48Ca beam and a target comprising a mixture of 249Cf (50.7%), 250Cf (12.9%), and 251Cf (36.4%). The experiment was performed at 252 MeV and 258 MeV beam energies. One event of 294Og was found at the lower beam energy, while no decays of oganesson isotopes were found at the higher beam energy; a cross section of 0.9 pb for the 249Cf(48Ca,3n) was estimated.

250,251Cf(48Ca,xn)298,299-xOg
In the 2015–2016 experiment, these reactions were performed in a search for 295Og and 296Og. No events attributable to a reaction with the 250Cf or 251Cf portions of the target were found. A repeat of this experiment was planned for 2017–2018.

248Cm(50Ti,xn)298-xOg
This reaction was originally planned to be tested at the JINR and RIKEN in 2017–2018, as it uses the same 50Ti projectile as planned experiments leading to elements 119 and 120. A search beginning in summer 2016 at RIKEN for 295Og in the 3n channel of this reaction was unsuccessful, though the study is planned to resume; a detailed analysis and cross section limit were not provided.

Theoretical calculations
Theoretical calculations done on the synthetic pathways for, and the half-life of, other isotopes have shown that some could be slightly more stable than the synthesized isotope 294Og, most likely 293Og, 295Og, 296Og, 297Og, 298Og, 300Og and 302Og. Of these, 297Og might provide the best chances for obtaining longer-lived nuclei, and thus might become the focus of future work with this element. Some isotopes with many more neutrons, such as some located around 313Og, could also provide longer-lived nuclei.

Theoretical calculations on evaporation cross sections 
The below table contains various targets-projectile combinations for which calculations have provided estimates for cross section yields from various neutron evaporation channels. The channel with the highest expected yield is given.

DNS = Di-nuclear system; 2S = Two-step; σ = cross section

References 
 Isotope masses from:

 
Oganesson
oganesson